The Bellwood Subdivision is a railroad line owned by CSX Transportation in Virginia, United States. At its north end the line continues south from the Richmond Terminal Subdivision and at its south end the line continues south as the North End Subdivision.

History

The line was once the northernmost segment of the Seaboard Air Line Railroad's main line (which is now CSX's S Line).  Seaboard affiliate Richmond, Petersburg and Carolina Railroad originally built the line between 1898 and 1900.  Seaboard designated the segment of the main line from Richmond to Raleigh as the Richmond Subdivision.

The Seaboard Air Line Railroad merged with the Atlantic Coast Line Railroad in 1967 with the merged company becoming the Seaboard Coast Line Railroad.  The Seaboard Coast Line abandoned the S Line past Centralia (where is merges with the A Line) to Norlina, North Carolina in after the merger in favor of trains using the A Line.  The line from Centralia to Richmond was then known as the Collier Subdivision.

In 1980, the Seaboard Coast Line's parent company merged with the Chessie System, creating the CSX Corporation.  The CSX Corporation initially operated the Chessie and Seaboard Systems separately until 1986, when they were merged into CSX Transportation.  The S Line from Centralia to Richmond was then known as the Bellwood Subdivision as it is today.  As of today, the next active segment of the S Line south is CSX's Norlina Subdivision.

Features

One of the line's notable features is that it runs past two of Richmond's historic railroad stations: Main Street Station, and Broad Street Station.  Another feature is that it runs through Richmond's Triple Crossing, a rare instance of three railroad lines crossing at different levels.  The Bellwood Subdivision passes through the middle level of the Triple Crossing.  The line's bridge over the James River is also a notable feature which dates back to the Seaboard Air Line Railroad.

See also
 List of CSX Transportation lines

References

CSX Transportation lines
Rail infrastructure in Virginia
Seaboard Air Line Railroad